Cedar Creek is a  long 2nd order tributary to the Youghiogheny River in Westmoreland County, Pennsylvania.

Course
Cedar Creek rises about 3 miles northeast of Arnold City, Pennsylvania, and then flows north to join the Youghiogheny River about 2 miles northeast of Sweeneys Crossroads.

Watershed
Cedar Creek drains  of area, receives about 40.1 in/year of precipitation, has a wetness index of 354.20, and is about 43% forested.

References

Tributaries of the Youghiogheny River
Rivers of Pennsylvania
Rivers of Westmoreland County, Pennsylvania
Allegheny Plateau